Mahbubul Alam Anik (born 7 September 1996) is a Bangladeshi cricketer. He made his List A debut for Victoria Sporting Club in the 2016–17 Dhaka Premier Division Cricket League on 8 May 2017. He made his first-class debut for Dhaka Division in the 2018–19 National Cricket League on 1 October 2018.

References

External links
 

1996 births
Living people
Bangladeshi cricketers
Dhaka Division cricketers
Victoria Sporting Club cricketers
People from Gopalganj District, Bangladesh